Events from the year 1743 in Denmark.

Incumbents
 Monarch – Christian VI
 Prime minister – Johan Ludvig Holstein-Ledreborg

Events
 2 August 
The Barony of Christiansdal is established by Ide Margrethe Reventlow from the manors of Adserstrup and Grimsted.
 The Barony of Conradsb org is established by Ide Margrethe Reventlow for her son Christian Frederik Knuth from the manors of ne Sørup, Sandbygård and Rosengård.
 30 Secember  Christian VI grants Johan Sigismund Schulin the Frederiksdal estate north of Copenhagen as a New Year present.

Undated
 Adam Gottlob Moltke assumes the post of Court Marshal, secured for him by crown prince Frederick, later King Frederick V.

Undated

Births
 11 June – Arnoldus von Falkenskiold, colonel (died 1819)
 September 11 – Nikolaj Abraham Abildgaard, painter (died 1809)
 October 2 or 14 – Erik Pauelsen, painter (died 1790)
 November 29 – Joachim Castenschiold, military officer (died 1817)

Deaths
 January 7 – Anne Sophie Reventlow, royal mistress, spouse by bigamy, later  queen consort (born 1693)

References

 
1740s in Denmark
Denmark
Years of the 18th century in Denmark